Taina J. Fox-Matamua is a New Zealand rugby union player who plays for Zebre Parma in United Rugby Championship.
His position of choice is Number 8.

Tasman 
He played 5 games for Tasman in 2018 and 1 game in 2019. In September 2020 he was named in the Tasman Mako squad for the 2020 Mitre 10 Cup.

References

External links
itsrugby.co.uk profile

1997 births
Living people
New Zealand rugby union players
People educated at St Peter's College, Auckland
Place of birth missing (living people)
Rugby union flankers
Rugby union number eights
Rugby union players from Auckland
Tasman rugby union players
Zebre Parma players